Albert Marie (born 3 March 1957) is a Seychellois long-distance runner. He competed in the marathon at the 1980 Summer Olympics.

International competitions

References

External links
 

1957 births
Living people
Athletes (track and field) at the 1980 Summer Olympics
Athletes (track and field) at the 1984 Summer Olympics
Seychellois male long-distance runners
Seychellois male marathon runners
Olympic athletes of Seychelles
Place of birth missing (living people)